Parnassus is the annual literary arts magazine of Northern Essex Community College in Haverhill, Massachusetts. The magazine has been in publication since 1965, and was a bi-annual publication until 2008, when it switched to a yearly publication, with issues released at the end of each year's spring semester in May. Parnassus is a free publication, and copies can be found at the Haverhill campus of NECC while available.

Parnassus is edited by students of NECC, and its contents feature student work in the areas of fiction, poetry, creative non fiction, photography, and other assorted artwork. The magazine's advisor has been professor Patrick Lochelt since 2006. The magazine is a part of the Liberal Arts department at NECC, and membership in the editorial staff is open to all current NECC students in either the fall or spring semesters each year.

Guest authors and artists
Since 2008, Parnassus has regularly featured work from notable New England-area guest authors and artists:

 2008: Steve Almond's short story "Sweet Jesus"
 2009: Andre Dubus III's short story "Tracks and Ties"
 2010: NECC Poets (a group of alumni and faculty poets from NECC)
 2011: Stephen King's short story "Night Surf"
 2012: Gregory Maguire's short story "In That Country" (First publication)
2014: Junot Diaz' short story "Homecoming, With Turtle"
2016: Diannely Antigua - poetry compilation
2017: Michael Cormier's short story "The Worshipping Tree"
2018: Lance Hidy - artwork compilation
2019: Dale Rogers Jr. - sculpture compilation

Recent issues and awards

References

External links
 Parnassus Literary Arts Magazine
 Northern Essex Community College

Annual magazines published in the United States
Literary magazines published in the United States
Student magazines published in the United States
Biannual magazines published in the United States
Magazines established in 1965
Magazines published in Massachusetts